The National Construction Equipment Museum is a non-profit organization located in Bowling Green, Ohio, United States that is dedicated to preserving the history of construction, dredging and surface mining industries and equipment.  The museum is operated by the Historical Construction Equipment Association and features many different types of construction equipment, including cranes, shovels, rollers, scrapers, bulldozers, dump trucks, concrete mixers, drills and other heavy equipment.

At the end of December 2021 an effort began to expand the museum.

References

External links
Historical Construction Equipment Association
National Construction Equipment Museum - Discover Ohio
Information about the museum's holdings and visitation
Ohio Traveler - article about the museum

Museums in Wood County, Ohio
Transportation museums in Ohio
Engineering vehicles
Technology museums in Ohio
Industry museums in Ohio
Bowling Green, Ohio